Robin Beth Schaer is an American poet.

Biography
Born in 1971, she graduated from Colgate University and Columbia University, and has taught at Columbia University, The New School, Cooper Union, Oberlin College and worked at the Academy of American Poets.

She is the author of one book of poetry, Shipbreaking. Her work has appeared in Rattapallax, Denver Quarterly, Guernica, Painted Bride Quarterly, and Barrow Street, Washington Square.

She currently teaches at Case Western Reserve University and has worked as a deckhand aboard the Bounty, and lived in New York City.

Awards
 Yaddo
 Djerassi Resident Artists Program
 Saltonstall Foundation Fellowship
 Virginia Center for the Creative Arts Fellowship

Works
Shipbreaking (Anhinga 2015)
"Falling Overboard", on the loss of HMS Bounty during Hurricane Sandy, "Paris Review", November 2012  
"Flight Distance", "Tornado", and "Wildfire", "The Awl", October 21. 2010
"Insomnia", Guernica, September 2005
"Mourning"; "After Mourning", Rattapallax
"Endangerment Finding", Poems for the First 100 Days, April 22, 2009

Anthologies

References

External links
"Official Homepage"
"Three Poems By Robin Beth Schaer", "The Awl"
"Robin Beth Schaer", Fishouse
"Robin Beth Schaer reads “Bright star! would I were steadfast as thou art” by John Keats", Poets on Poets

1971 births
Living people
Colgate University alumni
Columbia University alumni
Columbia University faculty
Cooper Union faculty
American women poets
21st-century American poets
21st-century American women writers
The New School faculty